Ay Dughmish (also Romanized as Āy Dūghmīsh; also known as Āydoghmīsh) is a village in Cham Rud Rural District, Bagh-e Bahadoran District, Lenjan County, Isfahan Province, Iran. At the 2006 census, its population was 16, in 8 families.

References 

Populated places in Lenjan County